The Playbirds is a 1978 British sexploitation film, made by Irish-born director Willy Roe and starring 1970s pin-up Mary Millington alongside Glynn Edwards, Suzy Mandel and Windsor Davies. It was the official follow-up to Come Play with Me, one of the most successful of the British sex comedies of the 1970s, which also starred Millington.

Plot
In London, an unidentified serial killer targets female models, strangling each woman and marking the forehead with the number of the victim. Scotland Yard detectives Jack Holbourne and Harry Morgan are assigned to investigate and discover that all of the women had recently appeared in the pornographic magazine Playbirds. Four suspects are identified: the magazine's publisher, Harry Dougan; photographer Terry Day; a street preacher called Hern; and anti-pornography campaigner George Ransome MP. Dougan and Day are quickly discounted. Lena Cunningham, Playbirds next star model, is given round-the-clock police protection, but the killer takes advantage of a brief security lapse to enter her flat and murder her in the living room, thus claiming his fourth victim.

To draw out the killer, Holbourne and Morgan decide to send in an undercover policewoman posing as an up-and-coming Playbirds model. Following "auditions" at the Yard, in which female officers are made to perform striptease, Holbourne and Morgan recruit Sergeant Lucy Sheridan, who takes a job at a massage parlour to set up her introduction to Dougan. Ransome, who secretly enjoys pornography that he obtains from Day, tries to slip into a house party being hosted by Dougan and some of the models. He is assumed to be the killer and attempts to flee, but in the ensuing police chase nearly drowns in a pond and is taken to hospital. Hern is arrested for the murders after he is found to have spied on the models during a photo shoot.

In the final scene, a man who appears to be Hern breaks into Sheridan's flat and strangles her in her bathtub. While committing the murder, "Hern" reveals that he is actually the preacher's twin brother.

Cast

 Mary Millington ...  WPC Lucy Sheridan 
 Alan Lake ...  Harry Dougan 
 Glynn Edwards ...  Inspector Holbourne 
 Derren Nesbitt ...  Jeremy 
 Suzy Mandel ...  Lena 
 Windsor Davies ...  Assistant Police Commissioner 
 Penny Spencer ...  WPC Andrews 
 Gavin Campbell ...  Inspector Harry Morgan 
 Kenny Lynch ...  Police Doctor 
 Sandra Dorne ...  Dougan's Secretary
 Dudley Sutton ...  Hern 
 Alec Mango ...  Ransome 
 Pat Astley ...  Doreen 
 Ballard Berkeley ...  Trainer 
 Michael Gradwell ...  Terry Day 
 Anthony Kenyon ...  Dolby 
 Ron Flangan ...  Wilson 
 André Trottier ...  Kenny
 John M. East ...  Media Man  
 Gordon Salkilld ...  Police Photographer
 Nigel Gregory ...  Expert 1 
 Tom McCabe ...  Expert 2 
 Pat Gorman ...  Expert 3 
 Susie Silvey ...  WPC Taylor 
 Cosey Fanni Tutti ...  Extra (uncredited) 
 Howard Nelson ...  Caped man (uncredited) 
 Tony Scannell ...  Man at depot (uncredited)

Production
Filmed over four weeks in the winter of 1977, The Playbirds was the official follow-up to Come Play with Me, which also starred Mary Millington. In The Playbirds, Millington plays an undercover policewoman investigating the murders of models from David Sullivan's magazine Playbirds. The title sequence shows Millington walking through Soho when it was at the height of its domination by the sex industry, giving a visual record of the district's history. Millington collaborated with director Willy Roe on two further sexploitation pictures, Confessions from the David Galaxy Affair and Queen of the Blues, both released theatrically in the summer of 1979.

Release and reception
The film ran in London for 34 consecutive weeks and took £177,000.

In a contemporary review for The Monthly Film Bulletin, Clyde Jeavons summed up the film as "standard British sex fare thinly disguised as a police thriller of the old Scotland Yard variety". On the performances, he commented that Millington "speaks her lines as methodically as she strips, while one or two good actors like Glynn Edwards stand around looking suitably shamefaced." Films Illustrated said that despite the film's sexual content, it resembled "an old-time British second feature transplanted to the '70s".

In a 2022 review, Eddie Harrison (a contributor to The List) gave The Playbirds zero stars, characterising it as "grubby, bottom-rung British sexploitation" with a "sub-Giallo plot" and supporting cast made up of "slumming British comedy stars". He condemned the film's "deeply misogynist" tone, noting that while the striptease scenes "[objectify] women in the crudest possible way", the audience is drawn into a series of "vicarious 'thrills' as the same women are hunted down and brutally murdered".

Special-edition DVD / Blu Ray 
The Playbirds was released on DVD in the United Kingdom on 9 August 2010 by Odeon Entertainment. The film has been digitally remastered and the disc features an extensive stills gallery, production notes written by historian Simon Sheridan, plus Mary Millington's World Striptease Extravaganza (1981) and Response, a short lesbian film starring Mary Millington, made in 1974. The film was released on Blu Ray in 2020 as part of the Mary Millington Movie Collection. The Blu Ray was released by Screenbound Pictures and has  audio commentary by biographer Simon Sheridan and director Willy Roe.

See also
Emmanuelle in Soho
Pornography in the United Kingdom

References

Bibliography
Keeping the British End Up: Four Decades of Saucy Cinema by Simon Sheridan (fourth edition) (Titan Publishing, London) (2011)

External links

1970s erotic films
1970s exploitation films
1970s mystery films
1970s police procedural films
1970s serial killer films
1978 films
1978 crime films
British detective films
British police films
British serial killer films
1970s English-language films
Films about modeling
Films about pornography
Films about violence against women
Films set in London
Police detective films
British sexploitation films
1970s British films